Tres Piedras (Spanish: three rocks) is an unincorporated community in Taos County, northern New Mexico, United States, adjacent to Carson National Forest.

Geography
Tres Piedras is located approximately 30 miles northwest of Taos, and west of the Rio Grande on U.S. Route 64. Tres Piedras is on the western edge of a sagebrush plain, with ponderosa pines growing throughout the village. The village is adjacent to the Carson National Forest. The ZIP Code for Tres Piedras is 87577.

History
The earliest maps, from the 1770s, show the name Piedras de los Carneros, or Rocks of the Sheep, possibly denoting a population of Bighorn Sheep. While the mountains and valleys east of the Rio Grande were colonized by Spanish agriculturalists & pastoralists some 200 years earlier, the Taos Plateau and Tusas Mountains were used by the nomadic peoples: Ute, Comanche, Kiowa and Jicarilla Apache, and so weren't utilized by the pobladores or Hispano colonists until well after the  Mexican-American War (1846–1848) and subsequent presence of the U. S. Army.

The village, named for three outcroppings of granite, was settled in 1879 and became a small ranching and timber village. Homesteaders, sawmills, small scale dry farming and mining activity slowly augmented the population through the late nineteenth and early twentieth centuries. Some Mormon pioneers from the San Luis valley to the north also made their way to Tres Piedras and established themselves.

By the turn of the twentieth century several villages were established in the area: Hopewell, 20 miles to the west, a gold-mining town; Las Tusas, nine miles west, a largely Hispanic farming community spread along the river valley of the same name, and No Agua (no water), 9 miles north on the railway line. All three of these places are virtually uninhabited today.
Between 1880 and 1941 Tres Piedras was a railroad stop on the narrow gauge Chili Line railroad that operated between Antonito, Colorado and Santa Fe, New Mexico. The village still has the old railroad water tower.

Recreation
It is a granite climbing area, one of two west of the Rio Grande in New Mexico.

References

Further reading
 

Census-designated places in New Mexico
Villages in Taos County, New Mexico